Froeschneria is a genus of dirt-colored seed bugs in the family Rhyparochromidae. There are about five described species in Froeschneria.

Species
These five species belong to the genus Froeschneria:
 Froeschneria infumatus (Distant, 1893)
 Froeschneria multispinus (Stal, 1874)
 Froeschneria oblitus (Distant, 1893)
 Froeschneria piligera (Stal, 1862)
 Froeschneria vicinalis (Distant, 1893)

References

Rhyparochromidae
Articles created by Qbugbot